= Geothermal springs of Nepal =

About 29 geothermal springs has been identified in Nepal mostly located in the banks of Mahakali, Karnali, Tila, Kaligandaki, Myagdi, Marshyangdi, Trishuli, Singhya, Budi khola near sila home and Bhotekoshi rivers. Twenty three of them are officially recognized by the Nepal government. The source of heat is the Main Central Thrust.

The list of geo-thermal springs in Nepal is shown in the table below which includes the chemical composition along with temperature and pH.

Name	Location	Latitude	Longitude	Temperature (C)	Flow (lps)	pH	Ca	Mg	Cl	HCO3	CO3	TDS	Na	K	Fe	SO4	SiO2	B
Mayangdi Khola Thermal Springs.	Mayangdi	28 22 10N	83 30 34 E	40	2	8.13	2	17		350	270	1340	460	49	0.35	70	43	0.25
Kodari Thermal Springs	Rasuwa	27 56 33N	83 57 00E	42	5	7.3	60.12	20.67	31.5	6.21	trace	822	200	35	0.18	65	3.85	3.6
Rear Thermal Spring	Rear	27 55N	82 20E	33	1.5	8.5	8.5	44.08	11.55	21.08	nil	7.96	310	22	0.2	72	38	6
Surai Khola Thermal Spring	Surai	27 47N	82 15E	37	2	8.85	10.03	40.12	3.19	370	180	510	125	5.4	1.45	70	32.1	trace
Sribagar	Darchula	29.9N	80.6E	73	0.85	7	n.d.	8.5	34.2	n.d.	0	516	lOO	11		18.5	35	0
Sina-Tatopani	Darchula	29.9N	80.7E		0.76													
Chamaliya	Darchula	29.7N	80.6E	warm	0.25	7	n.d.	n.d.	39.6	n.d.	0	1320	n.d.	n.d.		10.7	10	n.d.
Bajhang-Tapoban	Bajhang	29.6N	81.2E	warm	0.2	6	n.d.	10	50.1	n.d.	0	444	n.d.	22		25.9	16	0
Dhanchauri-Luma	Jumla	29.3N	82.3E	24	0.6	7	6.1	0.2	82	217	157	803	49	1.3		104	56	0
TilaNadi	Jumla	29.2N	82.1E	42		8	6	1.2	45	0	0	353	56	0		130	60	0
Jomsom	Jomsom	29.8N	83.7E	21	0.2	8	113	54	95.9	302	218	889.3	60	5.6		249	14.3	2.4
Mustang Tatopani	Tatopani-Mustang	28.5N	83.7E	71	1.8	7	102	30	555	387.5	280	1841	365	90		217	67.6	13
Sadhu Khola	Sadhu Khola	28.4N	84.2E	69	1.39	7	10	0.6	286	78	56.3	954	300	12		197	60	0
Chilime	Chilime	28.3N	85.3E	55	8	7	30	14	0	120	86.6	148	23	17		0	40	0
